Pancalia pyrophracta is a moth in the family Cosmopterigidae. It was described by Edward Meyrick in 1923. It is found in the Assam, India.

References

Moths described in 1923
Antequerinae